Priska "Piroška" Polačeková (born October 29, 1954 in Dunajská Streda) is a former Czechoslovak/Slovak handball player who competed in the 1980 Summer Olympics.

In 1980 she was part of the Czechoslovak team which finished fifth in the Olympic tournament. She played all five matches and scored four goals.

References 

1954 births
Living people
Czechoslovak female handball players
Slovak female handball players
Olympic handball players of Czechoslovakia
Handball players at the 1980 Summer Olympics
Sportspeople from Dunajská Streda